"Help" is the fourth episode of the seventh and final season of the television series Buffy the Vampire Slayer.

Plot
Patrolling at night at a funeral home, Buffy, Xander and Dawn discuss Buffy's nervousness about her new job and the struggle she may face while trying to balance her Slayer job with her duties as a school counselor. At the high school the next day, Buffy talks with various students who all have their own problems, including trouble with bullies and violence, anxiety, homosexuality and plain boredom. Willow and Xander walk together and talk about Buffy's struggles and Willow's worries about her role in dealing with the impending Hellmouth danger. With Xander's support, Willow visits Tara's grave.

Buffy talks with more students, including her own sister, but one girl, Cassie Newton, stuns Buffy when she confesses that she will die next Friday and that there will be many coins. As she leaves for class, Cassie compliments Buffy's shirt and warns her against spilling something on it. Buffy reports Cassie to Principal Wood, but he is not helpful. After spilling coffee onto her white shirt, Buffy is apprehensive and sends Dawn to befriend Cassie. Dawn catches up with Cassie and they talk about Cassie's friend Mike, who has continuously asked Cassie to an upcoming dance and been rejected every time.

Willow investigates Cassie on the computer, and finds Cassie's website filled with sad, morbid poetry. Though Buffy is convinced that Cassie has a precognitive ability and given up hope for survival, Xander and Willow are both skeptical despite all the experiences they had with the paranormal. Dawn returns home from school and thinks the reason for Cassie's problem is Mike, but Buffy and the others do not pay much attention. Willow finds a website on Cassie's father that shows his troubled past with the law and alcohol. Buffy and Xander visit Cassie's father and confront him with their suspicion that he may get drunk and hurt his daughter. Mr. Newton denies the accusation and reveals that his ex-wife only allows him to spend one weekend a month with his daughter. Buffy then finds out that Mr. Newton's weekend with Cassie was the previous one, therefore not only does he not have the chance to hurt Cassie, but if Cassie's prediction is true, then he will not see her again before her death. Satisfied that Mr. Newton is not involved, Buffy and Xander leave and bump into Cassie. She had been waiting for them outside of her father's house, and although she appreciates Buffy's efforts to find the cause, she knows there is nothing Buffy can do. Xander asks her if she is planning to kill herself, but Cassie denies it. Though she admits that she does not want to die, she cannot prevent her own demise.

Meanwhile, a group of guys in red cloaks walk around a circle and burn pictures of Cassie on a tray in the middle. Still motivated to help Cassie, Buffy reads poetry from Cassie's site and continues to investigate with the rest of the gang despite Xander and Willow's skepticism, and Dawn becomes close with Cassie and Mike. Buffy goes to the school basement and asks a still insane Spike if he knows anything about Cassie. He does not. As Buffy turns to leave, Spike asks her to stay, she refuses, worried that her presence will worsen his condition.

Upstairs, Wood and another administrator search through student lockers for anything suspicious. Buffy catches Mike in the halls and stops him to see if he may have intentions of hurting Cassie because she rejected him. He makes it clear he does not mind, and is thinking about asking Dawn to the dance instead. Coins fall from one of the lockers, drawing Buffy's attention. Buffy takes one of the coins and the number of the locker where they came from and talks to the student the locker belongs to. The student confesses that some of his friends want to hurt Cassie. Dawn and Cassie walk away from the school as Cassie reveals how she knows Buffy sent Dawn to befriend Cassie, but appreciates the genuine friendship she made with Dawn. Just then a student named Peter approaches, and Cassie, knowing she will not see Dawn again, tells Dawn that nothing that is about to happen is her fault. Peter asks Dawn about the dance, but not to ask her to go with him. When an irritated Dawn turns back toward Cassie, she is gone.

At the school that night, the cloaked group gathers again around a circle of coins and one of the boys reveals to be Peter. He checks with the others to make sure the school is secure and that no one can get in or out. Then, he pulls a bound, blindfolded and gagged Cassie out to the circle and holds a meat cleaver to her neck. She is to be sacrificed to a demon that will provide the boys with "infinite riches". As Peter starts the ritual, Buffy reveals herself as one of the cloaked people, who is only there to prove the ritual is fake, but a large demon appears behind her, proving her wrong. Buffy fights the demon and Spike shows up with a flaming torch to help, having temporarily regained his sanity. Buffy uses the torch to burn the demon while Spike cuts Cassie free from her bonds. After he rips her gag off, Cassie says that Buffy will one day tell him how she feels about him. Desperately, Peter drags himself toward the fried demon, demanding his money. The burned demon leans up and bites Peter on the shoulder once before exploding into dust. As Buffy and Cassie walk away together, a crossbow booby trap set by one of the cloaked boys nearly kills Cassie, but Buffy stops the bolt. Buffy tells Cassie that one person can make a difference, to which Cassie says Buffy will make a difference, before gasping and falling to the ground, dead.

The next day, the Scooby Gang solemnly talks about how Cassie died because of a congenital heart defect. She was always going to die, no matter what happened, and Cassie knew that Buffy would be at her side when her prediction came true. Buffy feels that she has failed, but a devastated Dawn corrects her, saying Buffy did not fail since she tried to save Cassie; it was because of her that Dawn and Cassie were friends. The gang are now convinced as Buffy of Cassie's unique gift; they all sadly realize that even though they may be able to avert outcomes, they cannot change fate.

References

External links
 

Buffy the Vampire Slayer (season 7) episodes
2002 American television episodes
Television episodes about precognition
Television episodes about death
Television episodes about bullying